Anthony Ward (born 4 April 1970) is an English former professional footballer who played in the Football League as a midfielder. Ward started his career as a youth player at Everton before signing on loan for Doncaster Rovers in 1988 where he made his Football League debut. He made 4 league appearances for Doncaster Rovers and 1 in the FA Cup before signing for Wigan Athletic the following season.

References

1970 births
Living people
English footballers
Association football midfielders
Everton F.C. players
Doncaster Rovers F.C. players
Wigan Athletic F.C. players
Chorley F.C. players
Marine F.C. players
Runcorn F.C. Halton players
English Football League players